The following is a list of the chairs of the Federal Communications Commission.

References

Federal Communications Commission